Hubbard may refer to:

Places

Canada
Hubbard, Saskatchewan
Hubbards, Nova Scotia

Canada/United States
Mount Hubbard, a mountain on the Alaska/Yukon border
Hubbard Glacier, a large freshwater glacier in Alaska and Yukon

Greenland
Hubbard Glacier (Greenland), a glacier in the Inglefield Gulf

United States
Hubbard, Iowa
Hubbard, Minnesota
Hubbard, Missouri
Hubbard, Nebraska
Hubbard, Ohio
Hubbard, Oregon
Hubbard, Texas
Hubbard, Dodge County, Wisconsin
Hubbard, Rusk County, Wisconsin
Hubbard County, Minnesota
Hubbard Lake, Michigan (disambiguation)
Hubbard Township, Hubbard County, Minnesota
Hubbard Township, Polk County, Minnesota
Hubbard Township, Trumbull County, Ohio
Hubbard Brook Experimental Forest, an outdoor laboratory for ecological studies in central New Hampshire
Hubbard Creek, Texas
Hubbard Street, in Chicago, Illinois
Lake Ray Hubbard, a freshwater lake in Dallas and Rockwall County, Texas

People
Hubbard (surname), a surname
Fern Hubbard Orme (1903–1993), American educator and politician

Other
Hubbard Broadcasting, a radio and television broadcaster based in Minneapolis
Hubbard Medal, awarded by the National Geographic Society for distinction in exploration, discovery, and research
Hubbard model, in physics, a model for correlated electrons
Hubbard squash (Cucurbita maxima), a variety of winter squash
"Old Mother Hubbard", a nursery rhyme

See also
 Hubbard Lake (disambiguation)
 Hubard, a surname